Sequoia is a 1934 American drama film directed by Chester M. Franklin and written by Ann Cunningham, Sam Armstrong and Carey Wilson. The film stars Jean Parker, Russell Hardie, Samuel S. Hinds, Paul Hurst and Willie Fung. The film was released on December 22, 1934, by Metro-Goldwyn-Mayer.

Plot
Toni and her father Matthew Martin live in the sequoia forests of California. While Toni is out walking, she finds a puma, which she names 'Gato' and a young fawn that she calls 'Malibu.' Toni and her adopted animals become friends quickly. After several years, Toni and her father leave the woods and Gato and Malibu are returned to the wild. Later, when Toni and her father return, they find that the animals in the area have been decimated by logging and hunting. With aggressive hunting parties roaming the area, it is up to Gato and Malibu to survive.

Cast 
 Jean Parker as Toni Martin
 Russell Hardie as Bob Alden
 Samuel S. Hinds as Dr. Matthew Martin
 Paul Hurst as Bergman
 Willie Fung as Sang Soo
 Harry Lowe Jr. as Feng Soo
 Ben Hall as Joe

References

External links 
 
 
 
 

1934 films
American drama films
1934 drama films
Metro-Goldwyn-Mayer films
American black-and-white films
Films directed by Chester Franklin
Films scored by Herbert Stothart
1930s English-language films
1930s American films